FC Tavria-Skif Rozdol is an amateur Ukrainian football from Rozdol, Mykhailivka Raion. The club is owned by an agriculture company Tavria-Skif.

History 
The club was created in 1995. In 2015 more than half of the senior team was composed of former the Metalurh Zaporizhia football academy players.

Honours 
 Ukrainian Football Amateur League
 Runners-up (1): 2017–18
 Zaporizhia Oblast Championship
 Winners (4): 2014, 2015, 2016, 2017
 Runners-up (1): 2012
 Zaporizhia Oblast Cup
 Winners (2): 2015, 2016

Head coaches 
 2013-???? Oleksiy Oliynyk
 ????- Maksym Skorokhodov

References

External links 
 Official website.

 
Association football clubs established in 1995
1995 establishments in Ukraine
Football clubs in Zaporizhzhia Oblast
Amateur football clubs in Ukraine